Faucaria felina, tiger jaws (a name it shares with Faucaria tigrina), is a species of succulent plant in the family Aizoaceae. It is endemic to the southern Cape Provinces of South Africa, but also widely spread in culture. It has a clumping habit and blooms with yellow flowers. As its synonym Faucaria candida, white tiger jaws, it has gained the Royal Horticultural Society's Award of Garden Merit.

Subspecies
Faucaria felina had two subspecies, but these are no longer accepted:
Faucaria felina subsp. tuberculosa (Rolfe) L.E.Groen → now Faucaria tuberculosa
Faucaria felina subsp. britteniae (L. Bolus) L.E.Groen

References

Aizoaceae
Endemic flora of South Africa
Flora of the Cape Provinces